Sir John Croft (died 1419/20), of Dalton, Lancashire, was an English politician.

He was a Member (MP) of the Parliament of England for Lancashire in September 1388 and November 1390.

References

14th-century births
1420 deaths
English MPs September 1388
Members of the Parliament of England (pre-1707) for Lancashire
English MPs November 1390